The 1484 papal conclave (August 26–29) elected Pope Innocent VIII after the death of Pope Sixtus IV.

The election
At the death of Sixtus IV, the conclave of cardinals that met to elect his successor numbered thirty-two cardinals.

The immediate context of the election was the nearly unprecedented packing of the College of Cardinals by Sixtus IV, not only in terms of overall size, but also in terms of cardinal-nephews and crown cardinals. As a result, nearly all of the non-Venetian cardinals supported the continuation of Sixtus IV's policies of isolation towards the Republic of Venice, specifically the Peace of Bagnolo. However, the two factions of cardinals differed over whether the church ought to prioritize the continuation of the Italian League or should prioritize papal power (especially vis-a-vis Naples) over the preservation of the peace. Cardinal Borja led the first faction and Cardinal della Rovere, the second; these factions were roughly aligned with the Orsini and Colonna families, respectively.

The conclave was carried out by the largest non-schismatic College since the eleventh century. Because of an intense dispute between the Colonna and Orsini, the city of Rome was marked by far more civil unrest during the sede vacante than was to be expected historically. While Count Girolamo Riario was away besieging a Colonna stronghold, his palace was sacked and his wife fled to the Castel S. Angelo. Upon his return to the city Count Riario joined his wife and held the Castel until persuaded to withdraw from the city with payment of 4000 ducats.

In order to prevent the selection of Cardinal Barbo, on the evening before the election, after the cardinals retired for the night, the Dean of the College of Cardinals, Cardinal Giuliano della Rovere, nephew of the late Pope, and Cardinal Borgia, the Vice-Chancellor, visited a number of cardinals and secured their votes with the promise of various benefices.

Cardinal electors

Absentee cardinals

Notes

1484
15th-century elections
1484
15th-century Catholicism
Pope Innocent VIII